The 2016 Mid-America Intercollegiate Athletics Association football season is made up of 12 United States collegiate athletic programs that compete in the Mid-America Intercollegiate Athletics Association (MIAA) under the NCAA Division II for the 2016 college football season. The season began on Thursday, September 1, 2016. Northwest Missouri State enters the season as the Conference and National Champions.

Conference teams

Coaches
Please note that the information listed is the information before the season started.

Preseason outlook
Sporting News released their Top-25 on May 25, 2016. Two teams from the conference were ranked in the top 25: #1 Northwest Missouri State and #24 Emporia State.vOn June 15, 2016, the Lindy's NCAA Division II Preseason Top 25 was released, where four teams placed in the top 25 from the conference: #1 Northwest Missouri State, #12 Emporia State, #22 Central Missouri, and Pittsburg State and #25.

On August 2, MIAA Media Days was held at Children's Mercy Park in Kansas City. Northwest Missouri was chosen as #1 and Central Missouri was chosen as #2 for both Coaches and Media polls. The schools were ranked as follows:

( ) first place votes

( ) first place votes

On August 15, the American Football Coaches Association released the Preseason Division II Poll. Northwest Missouri State, the 2015 National Champions, was selected to finish first, Central Missouri was ranked at No. 20, and Emporia State was selected at No. 24. Central Oklahoma, Fort Hays State, and Pittsburg State all received votes.

On August 25, D2football.com released its Top 25 poll, which includes four MIAA schools. NW Missouri State was ranked 1st, Central Missouri 10th, Emporia State 12th, and Pittsburg State 24th.

Schedule
The first week of conference play began on Thursday, September 1, 2016 and ends on Saturday, November 12, 2016. The schedule is subject to change.

Week 1

Week 2

Week 3

Week 4

Week 5

Week 6

Week 7

Week 8

Week 9

Week 10

Week 11

Postseason

NCAA Division II Playoffs

Bowls

Sources:

Home game attendance

References